was a Japanese businessman.  He was head of the Yasuda zaibatsu at the end of World War II.  He is best known for the "Yasuda plan" which proposed dissolving the zaibatsu in Japan.

See also
 Yasuda clan

References

1907 births
1991 deaths